Kirkus Reviews (or Kirkus Media) is an American book review magazine founded in 1933 by Virginia Kirkus (1893–1980). The magazine is headquartered in New York City. Kirkus Reviews confers the annual Kirkus Prize to authors of fiction, nonfiction, and young readers' literature.

Kirkus Reviews, published on the first and 15th of each month, previews books before their publication. Kirkus reviews over 10,000 titles per year.

History

Virginia Kirkus was hired by Harper & Brothers to establish a children's book department in 1926. The department was eliminated as an economic measure in 1932 (for about a year), so Kirkus left and soon established her own book review service. Initially, she arranged to get galley proofs of "20 or so" books in advance of their publication; almost 80 years later, the service was receiving hundreds of books weekly and reviewing about 100.

Initially titled Bulletin by Kirkus' Bookshop Service from 1933 to 1954, the title was changed to Bulletin from Virginia Kirkus' Service from January 1, 1955, issue onwards, and successively shortened to Virginia Kirkus' Service with the December 15, 1964, issue, and Kirkus Service in 1967, before it attained its definitive title, Kirkus Reviews, with January 1, 1969, issue.

In 1985 Anne Larsen was brought on as fiction editor, soon to become editor, remaining the editorial head of Kirkus until 2006 and modifying the review format and style for improved readability, concision, accuracy, and impact.

Ownership
It was sold to The New York Review of Books in 1970 and subsequently sold by the Review to Barbara Bader and Josh Rubins, who served also as the publication's editors. In 1985, magazine consultant James B. Kobak acquired Kirkus Reviews. David LeBreton bought Kirkus from Kobak in 1993. BPI Communications, owned by Dutch publisher VNU, bought Kirkus from LeBreton in 1999. At the end of 2009, the company announced the end of operations for Kirkus.

The journal was purchased from VNU (by then renamed The Nielsen Company, or Nielson N.V.) on February 10, 2010, by businessman Herbert Simon. Terms were not disclosed. It was thereafter renamed Kirkus Media, and book industry veteran Marc Winkelman was made publisher.

Reviewing 
Kirkus Reviews has a traditional program of reviewing that does not require payment for reviews. Kirkus Reviews also offers an Indie program that allows book authors to purchase, but not modify or influence, reviews that the book author can choose whether or not to publish on the Kirkus website, and if published may also be published in the magazine or email newsletter based on Kirkus editor discretion.

Kirkus Prize 

In 2014, Kirkus Reviews started the Kirkus Prize, bestowing $50,000 prizes annually to authors of fiction, nonfiction, and young readers’ literature.

Winners

References

Sources

External links 
 
 Online archive at Issuu (February 1, 2011 – present)
 
 

Book review magazines
Magazines established in 1933
Semimonthly magazines
English-language magazines
Magazines published in New York City
Journalists from Pennsylvania